Weeping wattle is a common name for several plants and may refer to:

 Acacia saligna
 Peltophorum africanum